Chernet Gugesa Beshah (Amharic: ቸርነት ጉግሳ; born 13 September 1999) is an Ethiopian professional footballer who plays as a forward for Ethiopian Premier League club Saint George and the Ethiopia national team.

International career 
Gugesa made his international debut for the Ethiopia national team in a 0–0 2022 FIFA World Cup qualification tie with Lesotho on 26 August 2021.

Honours

Saint George S.C 

 Ethiopian Premier League: 2020–21

References 

1999 births
Living people
Saint George S.C. players
Ethiopian footballers
Ethiopia A' international footballers
2022 African Nations Championship players
Ethiopia international footballers